Petr Kolouch (born 30 October 1991) is a Czech ice hockey forward who is currently playing for HK Poprad of the Slovak Extraliga.

He made his debut in Czech Extraliga during the 2011–12 season with HC Vítkovice, and has also played in the second and third-tier Czech leagues.

Career statistics

Regular season and playoffs

References

External links
 

1991 births
Living people
AZ Havířov players
Czech ice hockey forwards
HC Frýdek-Místek players
HC Olomouc players
HC Vítkovice players
Hokej Šumperk 2003 players
Sportspeople from Ostrava
Graz 99ers players
HK Poprad players
Czech expatriate ice hockey players in Slovakia
Czech expatriate sportspeople in Austria
Expatriate ice hockey players in Austria